Pratibha Singh (born 16 June 1956) is an Indian politician from Himachal Pradesh and a Member of the Indian Parliament.

She is the widow of Virbhadra Singh, who was elected the Chief Minister of Himachal Pradesh on six occasions. She represents the Mandi constituency of Himachal Pradesh and is a member of the Indian National Congress.

Personal life
Pratibha Singh was born on 16 June 1956 in Shimla, Himachal Pradesh. She married Virbhadra Singh in 1985. She is his second wife. Virbhadra Singh's daughter from his first marriage, Abhilasha Kumari, served as a judge in Gujarat. Virbhadra Singh's son from his second marriage to Pratibha Singh, Vikramaditya Singh, serves as Member of Legislative Assembly from Shimla Rural constituency.

Political career
Pratibha Singh gained a seat in the Lok Sabha which is the lower house of the Parliament of India in the Indian general elections of 2004 by defeating Maheshwar Singh. In the 2013 (By Poll) elections, she was again elected from the same seat as well as in 2021.

Positions held

Electoral Performances

References

|-

|-

|-

1956 births
Living people
India MPs 2004–2009
People from Mandi district
Indian National Congress politicians from Himachal Pradesh
People from Shimla
Lok Sabha members from Himachal Pradesh
India MPs 2009–2014
Women in Himachal Pradesh politics
21st-century Indian women politicians
21st-century Indian politicians
Women members of the Lok Sabha
India MPs 2019–present